Takahito Niimi (新美貴士, born 26 September 1993) is a Japanese kickboxer competing in the featherweight division of K-1/Krush. He is the former Krush Featherweight champion.

As of July 2021, he was the #3 ranked Super Flyweight in the world by Combat Press.

Kickboxing career

Early career
Niimi made his professional debut against Sho Yamaguchi at HOOST CUP KINGS NAGOYA 4 - Kick Revolution on May 20, 2018. He won the fight by a first-round technical knockout. Niimi was scheduled to make his second professional appearance against TETSU at Krush.92 ～in NAGOYA～ on August 18, 2018. He won the fight by unanimous decision, with scores of 30-29, 30-28 and 30-28.

Niimi suffered his first professional loss against Ryuto Matsumoto at Suk Wanchai MuayThai Super Fight vol.5 on September 24, 2018, who won their bout by unanimous decision. Niimi rebounded by winning his next two fights against Takato and Yue Heng by stoppage.

Early K-1 career
Niimi was scheduled to face Rikiya Yamaura at KHAOS 8 on June 1, 2019. He won the fight by a third-round knockout, stopping Yamaura with repeated low kicks.

Niimi was scheduled to face Toma Tanabe at K-1 World GP 2019: Japan vs World 5 vs 5 & Special Superfight in Osaka on August 24, 2019. He lost the fight by unanimous decision, with all three judges scoring the fight 30-28 for Toma.

Niimi was scheduled to fight Tenma Sano at Krush 107 on November 8, 2019. He won the fight by majority decision, with scores of 29-29, 28-29 and 28-29.

For his sixth fight of the year, Niimi was scheduled to face Naoki Takahashi at K-1 World GP 2019 Japan: ～Women's Flyweight Championship Tournament～ on December 28, 2019. Niimi won the fight by unanimous decision.

His two-fight winning streak was snapped by Keito Okajima at Krush 114 on July 11, 2020, who their bout by unanimous decision.

Krush Featherweight champion

Krush Featherweight tournament
Niimi participated in the 2020 Krush Featherweight tournament, organized to crown the new champion as the title was left vacant by Yuki Egawa on February 3, 2020. He was scheduled to face Shuhei Kumura at Krush 119 on November 27, 2020, in the tournament semifinals. Niimi won the fight by unanimous decision.

Advancing to the tournament finals, Niimi faced Riku Morisaka. The fight was ruled a draw after the first three rounds were fought, with two of the judges scoring the bout as a draw (29-29 and 30-30), while the third judge scored it 30-29 in Niimi's favor. Accordingly, an extension rounds was fought, after which Niimi won a unanimous decision.

Title reign
Niimi was scheduled to make his first title defense against the undefeated Toma Tanabe at Krush 122 on February 27, 2021. The fight was a rematch of their August 24, 2019 meeting, which Toma won by unanimous decision. Niimi won the fight by majority decision, with scores of 30-28, 29-28 and 28-28.

For his second title defense, Niimi was scheduled to fight Keito Okajima at Krush 114 on June 25, 2021. The fight was likewise a rematch of the July 11, 2020 meeting, which Okajima won by unanimous decision. Niimi won the fight by first-round knockout, stopping Okajima 16 seconds into the round.

Niimi was scheduled to face Taito Gunji at K-1 World GP 2021: Yokohamatsuri on September 20, 2021. Niimi was unable to find much success against Taito and lost the fight by unanimous decision, with scores of 30-29, 30-29 and 30-27.

Niimi was scheduled to make his third Krush title defense against Tatsuki Shinotsuka at Krush 132 on December 18, 2021. He won the fight by a second-round knockout. Niimi knocked Shinotsuka down as soon as the fight started with a combination of a right hook and left straight, although he was unable to finish him in the remaining three minutes. He knocked Shinotsuka three more times in the second round, which forced the referee to wave the fight off.

Niimi was booked to face the former K-1 Featherweight titleholder Tatsuya Tsubakihara at K-1: K'Festa 5 on April 3, 2022. He lost the fight by unanimous decision. He lost the fight by unanimous decision, with two scorecards of 30–29 in Tsubakihara's favor, and one 30–28 scorecard.

Niimi was scheduled to make his fourth Krush featherweight title defense against Shuhei Kumura at Krush 137 on May 21, 2022. He lost the title by unanimous decision, with all three of the ringside officials scoring the bout 30–29 in favor of his opponent.

Continued featherweight career
Niimi faced the Enfusion and ONE Championship veteran Wang Junguang in the quarterfinal bout of the 2022 K-1 Featherweight World Grand Prix, which was held at K-1 World GP 2022 in Fukuoka on August 11, 2022. He lost the fight by unanimous decision, with all three judges scoring the bout 30–29 for Junguang.

Niimi faced Yuta Kunieda at K-1 World GP 2022 in Osaka on December 3, 2022. He won the fight by majority decision, with two judges scoring the bout 30–28 and 30–27 in his favor, while the third judge scored it an even 29–29 draw.

Niimi faced the RISE featherweight champion Keisuke Monguchi at RISE ELDORADO 2023 on March 26, 2023.

Titles and accomplishments
Krush
 2020 Krush Featherweight (-57.5kg) Champion (defended three times)
 2021 Krush Fighter of the Year

Fight record

|- style="background:#;"
| 2023-03-26 || ||align=left| Keisuke Monguchi || RISE ELDORADO 2023 || Tokyo, Japan || ||  || 
|-  style="background:#cfc"
| 2022-12-03||Win ||align=left| Yuta Kunieda ||  K-1 World GP 2022 in Osaka || Osaka, Japan || Decision (Majority)|| 3 || 3:00 

|-  style="background:#fbb"
| 2022-08-11|| Loss||align=left| Wang Junguang ||  K-1 World GP 2022 in Fukuoka, Tournament Quarterfinals || Fukuoka, Japan || Decision (Unanimous) ||3  ||3:00
|-
|-  style="text-align:center; background:#fbb;"
| 2022-05-21|| Loss||align=left| Shuhei Kumura|| Krush 137 || Tokyo, Japan || Decision (Unanimous) || 3 || 3:00 
|-
! style=background:white colspan=9 |
|- style="background:#fbb;" 
| 2022-04-03 || Loss ||align=left| Tatsuya Tsubakihara || K-1: K'Festa 5 || Tokyo, Japan || Decision (Unanimous) || 3 || 3:00
|-  style="text-align:center; background:#cfc"
| 2021-12-18 || Win|| align=left| Tatsuki Shinotsuka || Krush 132 || Tokyo, Japan || KO (Punches + knee) || 2 ||2:57 
|-
! style=background:white colspan=9 |

|-  style="text-align:center; background:#fbb;"
| 2021-09-20 || Loss || align=left| Taito Gunji || K-1 World GP 2021: Yokohamatsuri || Yokohama, Japan || Decision (Unanimous) || 3 ||3:00

|-  style="text-align:center; background:#cfc;"
| 2021-06-25|| Win || align=left| Keito Okajima || Krush 126 || Tokyo, Japan || KO (Punches) || 1 || 0:16
|-
! style=background:white colspan=9 |

|-  style="text-align:center; background:#cfc;"
| 2021-02-27|| Win || align=left| Toma || Krush 122 || Tokyo, Japan || Decision (Majority)|| 3 || 3:00 
|-
! style=background:white colspan=9 |

|-  style="text-align:center; background:#cfc;"
| 2020-11-27|| Win || align=left| Riku Morisaka || Krush 119, Featherweight Championship Tournament Final || Tokyo, Japan || Ext.R Decision (Unanimous)|| 4 || 3:00 
|-
! style=background:white colspan=9 |

|-  style="text-align:center; background:#cfc;"
| 2020-11-27|| Win || align=left| Shuhei Kumura || Krush 119, Featherweight Championship Tournament Semi Final || Tokyo, Japan || Decision (Unanimous)|| 3 || 3:00 

|-  style="text-align:center; background:#fbb;"
| 2020-07-11|| Loss || align=left| Keito Okajima || Krush 114 || Tokyo, Japan || Decision (Unanimous)|| 3 || 3:00 

|-  style="text-align:center; background:#cfc;"
| 2019-12-28|| Win || align=left| Naoki Takahashi || K-1 World GP 2019 Japan: ～Women's Flyweight Championship Tournament～ || Tokyo, Japan || Decision (Unanimous)|| 3 || 3:00 

|-  style="text-align:center; background:#cfc;"
| 2019-11-08|| Win || align=left| Tenma Sano || Krush 107 || Tokyo, Japan || Decision (Majority)|| 3 || 3:00 

|- style="text-align:center; background:#fbb;"
| 2019-08-24|| Loss ||align=left| Toma || K-1 World GP 2019: Japan vs World 5 vs 5 & Special Superfight in Osaka || Osaka, Japan || Decision (Unanimous) || 3 || 3:00

|-  style="text-align:center; background:#cfc;"
| 2019-06-01|| Win || align=left| Rikiya Yamaura || KHAOS 8 || Tokyo, Japan || KO (Low Kicks)|| 3 || 0:48 

|-  style="text-align:center; background:#cfc;"
| 2019-04-13|| Win || align=left| Wu Hoichan || Dragon Fight || Xianyang, China || Decision (Unanimous) || 3 || 3:00  

|-  style="text-align:center; background:#cfc;"
| 2019-02-23|| Win || align=left| Yue Heng || Wu Lin Feng 2019: WLF Championship in Zhengzhou || Zhengzhou, China || KO || 2 ||  

|-  style="text-align:center; background:#cfc;"
| 2018-12-23|| Win ||align=left| Takato || HOOST CUP KINGS NAGOYA 5 || Nagoya, Japan || TKO (Punches) || 1 || 1:43 

|-  style="text-align:center; background:#fbb;"
| 2018-09-24|| Loss||align=left| Ryuto Matsumoto || Suk Wanchai MuayThai Super Fight vol.5 || Nagoya, Japan || Decision (Unanimous) || 3 || 3:00 

|-  style="text-align:center; background:#cfc;"
| 2018-08-18|| Win ||align=left| Tetsuji Noda|| Krush.92 ～in NAGOYA～ || Nagoya, Japan || Decision (Unanimous)|| 3 || 3:00 

|-  style="text-align:center; background:#cfc;"
| 2018-05-20|| Win||align=left| Sho Yamaguchi || HOOST CUP KINGS NAGOYA 4 - Kick Revolution || Nagoya, Japan || TKO (3 Knockdowns) || 1 || 2:49 

|-
| colspan=9 | Legend:

See also
 List of male kickboxers
 List of Krush champions

References

Living people
1993 births
Japanese male kickboxers
Sportspeople from Aichi Prefecture
People from Anjō